Intraflagellar transport protein 57 homolog is a protein that in humans is encoded by the IFT57 gene.

Interactions 

IFT57 has been shown to interact with Caspase 8.

References

Further reading